Oranmore may refer to:
 Oranmore, a town on the outskirts of the city of Galway in Ireland
 Oranmore Castle, a castle in the town of Oranmore, County Galway
 Oranmore, Ontario, a community in the township of Magnetawan, Ontario, Canada

See also
Oran Mor (disambiguation)